Johan Christian Georg Hvoslef (1819–1889) was a Norwegian civil servant and lawyer.  He served as the County Governor of Jarlsberg og Laurvig and Lister og Mandal counties.

He received his cand. jur. degree in 1843. Soon afterwards, he was hired as a clerk and later an acting judge in Indre Sogn. In 1851 he was a court prosecutor in Lærdalsøyri. From 1856, he was town bailiff in Hammerfest. In 1865, he was appointed county governor of Jarlsberg and Larvik. He held that post from 1865 until 1882. In 1882, he was appointed as the Diocesan Governor of Kristianssand stiftamt as well as the County Governor of Lister og Mandals amt. He held that post until his death in 1889.

Johan C.G. Hvoslef was the son of Judge Jens Hvoslef and his wife Elisabeth Christine Mejlænder and the brother of Bishop Fredrik Waldemar Hvoslef who is known from the Kautokeino Uprising. In 1865, he married Amalie Eline Weidemann from Holmestrand. Anna Hvoslef was his daughter.

He was appointed a knight of the Order of St. Olav in 1868 for his meritorious service.

References

1818 births
1889 deaths
County governors of Norway